Edward Brereton (c. 1642 – 10 January 1725), of Borras, Denbighshire, was a Welsh politician.

He was a Member of Parliament (MP) for Denbigh Boroughs in 1689, 1690, 1695, 1698, February 1701, December 1701 and 1702.

References

1642 births
1725 deaths
17th-century Welsh politicians
Members of the Parliament of England for Denbighshire
Members of the Parliament of England (pre-1707) for constituencies in Wales
English MPs 1689–1690
English MPs 1690–1695
English MPs 1695–1698
English MPs 1698–1700
English MPs 1701
English MPs 1701–1702
English MPs 1702–1705